Nigel Johnson can refer to:

 Nigel Johnson (cricketer) (born 1952), Barbadian cricketer
 Nigel Johnson (footballer) (born 1964), English footballer
 Nigel Johnson (swimmer) (born 1953), British Olympic swimmer